Walt Wells (born October 26, 1967) is an American college football coach. He is the head football coach at Eastern Kentucky University, a position he has held since 2019.

Career
Wells has over 20 years of coaching experience as an offensive line coach and coordinator with previous stops at Eastern Kentucky (1997–2002, 2015), New Mexico State (2014), South Florida (2013) and Western Kentucky (2003–2012). He also coached at Cumberland University from 1994 to 1996 and Smryna High School from 1992 to 1993.

On February 7, 2017, Walt Wells was promoted to offensive line coach at the University of Tennessee. He joined the Vols in the spring of 2016 as an offensive quality control coach, working primarily with the offensive line.

On December 9, 2019, Wells was hired as the 15th head football coach at Eastern Kentucky University.

Personal life
Wells earned a bachelor's degree in finance from Belmont University in 1993 after transferring from Austin Peay State University, where he played football. He also obtained a master's degree in human relations management from Cumberland University in 1995. Wells and his wife, Jennifer, have two children: Madison and K. J.

On August 28, 2022, Walt Wells was hospitalized because he suffered a cardiac episode while at work. On August 29, 2022, Chief of Staff Garry McPeek had to be named acting head coach. On August 31, 2022, Wells was released from UK Hospital.

Head coaching record

* Conference schedule not played due to COVID-19 pandemic
^ Conference record for the ASUN-WAC AQ7 Challenge

^^ Could not coach game vs. Eastern Michigan due to health issues

^^^ Received the AQ7 Playoff bid due to Jacksonville State's transition to FBS

References

External links
 Eastern Kentucky profile

1967 births
Living people
American football offensive linemen
Austin Peay Governors football players
Cumberland Phoenix football coaches
Eastern Kentucky Colonels football coaches
Kentucky Wildcats football coaches
New Mexico State Aggies football coaches
South Florida Bulls football coaches
Tennessee Volunteers football coaches
Western Kentucky Hilltoppers football coaches
High school football coaches in Tennessee
Belmont University alumni
Coaches of American football from Tennessee
Players of American football from Nashville, Tennessee